Raisi is a village in Eshqabad Rural District, Miyan Jolgeh District, Nishapur County, Razavi Khorasan Province, Iran.

Raisi may also refer to:
 Qaleh Raisi, a town in and the capital of Charusa District, Kohgiluyeh County, Kohgiluyeh and Boyer-Ahmad Province, Iran

People with the name
 Ahmed Naser Al-Raisi (active from 1980), Emirati military general officer
 Ebrahim Raisi (born 1960), Iranian principlist politician
 Heshmat Raisi (born 1945),  Iranian communist
 Mansour Raisi (1928–1980), Iranian Olympic freestyle wrestler
 Rasoul Raisi (1924–2015), Iranian weightlifter

Persian-language surnames
Surnames of Emirati origin
Surnames of Omani origin